Hanazawa (written 華沢, 花澤 or 花沢, meaning "flower, swamp/marsh/dale") is a Japanese surname. Notable people with the surname include:

, Japanese voice actress
, Japanese manga artist
Kikka Hanazawa (born 1970), Japanese investor and fashion industry executive
, Japanese AV actress

Japanese-language surnames